is a Prefectural Natural Park in southern Miyazaki Prefecture, Japan. Established in 1958, the park is within the municipality of Miyakonojō. The area is celebrated for its cherry blossoms, waterfalls, and potholes - which have been designated a Natural Monument.

See also
 National Parks of Japan

References

External links
  Map of Mochio-Sekinoo Prefectural Natural Park

Parks and gardens in Miyazaki Prefecture
Protected areas established in 1958
1958 establishments in Japan